The 2014–15 season of the Oberliga was the seventh season of the Oberligas at tier five of the German football league system and the 41st season overall since reintroduction of the Oberligas in 1974. The regular season started in July 2014 and finished on 14 June 2015, followed by relegation and promotion play-offs.

The Oberliga is organised in fourteen regional divisions with the league champions promoted to the level above, the Regionalligas while the relegated teams drop down to the Verbandsligas and Landesligas.

Overview

In the 2014–15 season 243 clubs compete in the Oberligas, two less than in the previous season.

Of the fourteen league champions twelve were promoted to the Regionalliga while one, the Oberliga Hamburg champions TuS Dassendorf, declined promotion for the second year running. No club from the Oberliga Hamburg was promoted to the Regionalliga as the only club to apply for a licence, SC Victoria Hamburg, later withdrew for financial reasons after successfully passing the application process. One league champion, Bremer SV of the Bremen-Liga, missed out on promotion in the play-off round, as they had done in 2013–14. Apart from twelve of the fourteen Oberliga champions six runners-up also achieved promotion. Three of them, Bahlinger SC, FC Amberg and VfV 06 Hildesheim, had to go through the promotion round. The other three, Rot Weiss Ahlen, FC Oberlausitz and FC Schönberg 95, were directly promoted.

The two NOFV-Oberligas each had two teams directly promoted to the Regionalliga Nordost as the league was to be expanded from 16 to 18 clubs. Additionally, because 1. FC Magdeburg won promotion to the 3. Liga, a playoff between the two third-placed clubs in the NOFV-Oberligas determined a fifth team, the FSV 63 Luckenwalde, to move up.

The most successful goal scorer of the fourteen Oberligas was Sebastian Kinzel with 51 goals to his name.

The Oberligas also saw an exodus of reserve teams with seven clubs withdrawing their second team, those being VfR Aalen II, SV Wehen II, Erzgebirge Aue II, Chemnitzer FC II, Dynamo Dresden II, 1. FC Saarbrücken II and SpVgg Unterhaching II. The last two of those finished the season on relegation ranks and would have been relegated regardless. Apart from these seven teams another three non-reserve sides resigned from the Oberligas while 38 clubs were relegated.

The only team to complete the 2014–15 Oberliga season undefeated was Bremer SV, with a record of 25 wins, five draws and no defeat. The club scored 118 goals during the season, second only to Brinkumer SV with 119. At the other end 1. FC Schwalmstadt was the worst Oberliga club with a record of one win, three draws and 26 defeats, accumulating just six points during the season. The team with the worst defence was SV Türkspor Bremen which conceded 139 goals.

2014–15 season
The 2014–15 league champions, promoted and relegated teams, the league strength (S), the top scorer and the number of goals they scored, as far as has been determined:

 ‡ Denotes club declined promotion.
 † Denotes club withdrew from league.
 ¶ Denotes club failed to win promotion.
 # Denotes club was ineligible for promotion.

Promotion play-offs
Promotion play-offs were held at the end of the season to the Regionalliga Südwest, Regionalliga Bayern, Regionalliga Nord and Regionalliga Nordost:

Regionalliga Südwest
The runners-up of the Hessenliga, Oberliga Rheinland-Pfalz/Saar and the Oberliga Baden-Württemberg, TSV Lehnerz, SC Hauenstein and Bahlinger SC, competed for one more spot in the Regionalliga. While the first game had been scheduled the second and third depended on the outcome of the first. Bahlinger SC won promotion to the Regionalliga courtesy to a win and a draw.

Regionalliga Bayern
The 15th and 16th placed Regionalliga teams, SV Heimstetten and VfR Garching, play the runners-up of the northern and southern division. In the north this is FC Amberg while, in the south, FC Pipinsried qualified regardless of its place in the table as no other team applied for a Regionalliga licence. The winner of these games then play each other for one more spot in the Regionalliga. Should TSV 1860 Munich have suffered relegation from the 2. Bundesliga its reserve team would be forced to leave the Regionalliga. In this case 17th placed Regionalliga club SV Seligenporten would have entered the relegation play-offs and Heimstetten would have retained their Regionalliga place.

First round
First leg

Second leg

Second round
The winners of the first round play each other for the one available spot in the Regionalliga:
First leg

Second leg

Regionalliga Nord
The champions of the Bremen-Liga, Oberliga Hamburg and the Schleswig-Holstein-Liga as well as the runners-up from the Niedersachsenliga enter a play-off for two more spots in the Regionalliga Nord. Eight clubs from these four leagues applied for a Regionalliga licence. As the only club from Hamburg to apply for a licence, SC Victoria Hamburg, later declined participation only three clubs take part in the promotion round, Bremer SV, TSV Schilksee and VfV 06 Hildesheim, with the latter two promoted:

Regionalliga Nordost
The third-placed teams from the two NOFV-Oberligas will compete in a two-legged playoff to fill the vacancy left by 1. FC Magdeburg, who won promotion to the 3. Liga.

First leg

Second leg

References

External links
 Fussball.de  Official results website of the German Football Association
 Weltfussball.de  German football results and tables
 Scoresway.com Oberliga tables and results

 
5
Germ